Neotaracia plaumanni is a species of tephritid or fruit flies in the genus Neotaracia of the family Tephritidae.

Distribution
Paraguay, Brazil, Argentina.

References

Tephritinae
Insects described in 1938
Diptera of South America